Keiju (written: 啓珠 or 桂樹) is a masculine Japanese given name. Notable people with the name include:

 (born 1971), Japanese footballer
 (1923–2010), Japanese actor
 (born 2006), Japanese singer

Japanese masculine given names